Kelly Greyson is an American actress. Her acting roles include Lana in Return to the Hiding Place, Tyra in Little Boy, Jocelyn Stewart in To Have and To Hold, Catie Reynolds in Disturbing The Peace with Guy Pearce and Pam Harris in Out of Death starring Bruce Willis.

Career
Greyson made her film debut as Lana in Return to the Hiding Place (Originally released as "War of Resistance"). In 2013, she took the lead role in historical drama Alone yet Not Alone directed by George Escobar, where she played Barbara, who was captured and later adopted as Susquehanna by the Delaware Tribe of Indians during the French and Indian War.

In 2014, Greyson was cast for the role of a young socialite and CIA agent in the spy thriller Double Identity. In 2015, she played a role of Sheila in Woodlawn, a 2015 American Christian sports drama film directed by the Erwin brothers. The same year she appeared as Tyra in Little Boy and starred as Jocelyn Stewart in To Have and To Hold, a drama film based on the novel written by Mary Johnston in 1900.

In 2017, Greyson played Maggie in Broken Memories, an independent romantic-drama about the main hero Jasper's struggle with Alzheimer’s and his relations with the family and friends. The film received two awards from The IndieFEST Film Awards.

In 2020, Greyson played Catie Reynolds in Disturbing the Peace, directed by York Alec Shackleton and starring Guy Pearce. Most recently, Greyson appeared in The Fortress, The Fortress 2 and Out of Death starring Bruce Willis.

Since 2017, Kelly Greyson has been actively involved in civil campaigns to end violence against women and collaborating with PNG Tribal Foundation, a non-governmental charity organization based in Papua New Guinea.

Filmography

References

External links
 
 

Living people
21st-century American actresses
American film actresses
American film producers
American women film producers
Year of birth missing (living people)